Savu is an island in East Nusa Tenggara province, Indonesia.

Savu may also refer to:
Savu people, ethnic group living on Savu and the neighbouring island of Raijua
Savu language, language spoken by the Savu people, one of the Bima-Sumba languages
Savu Sea, Indonesian sea named for Savu island
Savu, a tributary of the river Olteț in Romania
Savu River (Fiji)

People with the given name or family name Savu include:
Ilie Savu, Romanian football player
Mihai Savu, Romanian Olympic fencer
Alin Mircea Savu, Romanian football player
Savu Viliame, Fijian cricketer

Romanian-language surnames